Semengi (also Romanized as Semengī; also known as Samenglū) is a village in Efzar Rural District, Efzar District, Qir and Karzin County, Fars Province, Iran. At the 2006 census, its population was 446, in 87 families.

References 

Populated places in Qir and Karzin County